This is a list of law enforcement agencies in the state of Utah.

According to the US Bureau of Justice Statistics' 2008 Census of State and Local Law Enforcement Agencies, the state had 136 law enforcement agencies employing 4,782 sworn police officers, about 175 for each 100,000 residents.

State agencies 
 Utah Department of Corrections
 Utah Adult Probation & Parole
 Utah Department of Human Services
 Division of Juvenile Justice Services
 Utah Department of Natural Resources
 Utah Division of State Parks and Recreation
 Park Rangers
 Utah Division of Wildlife Resources
 Conservation Officers
 Utah Attorney General and Assistant Attorneys General
 Utah Department of Public Safety
 Liquor Enforcement Section
 Utah State Fire Marshal
 Utah Highway Patrol
 Utah State Bureau of Investigation
 Utah Department of Transportation - Motor Carrier Safety - Port of Entry
 Utah Division of Insurance Fraud
 Utah State Tax Commission - Motor Vehicle Enforcement Division (MVED)
Utah State Hospital - Campus Police

County agencies 

 Beaver County Sheriff's Office
 Box Elder County Sheriff's Office
 Cache County Sheriff's Office
 Carbon County Sheriff's Office
 Daggett County Sheriff's Office
 Davis County Sheriff's Office
 Duchesne County Sheriff's Office
 Emery County Sheriff's Office
 Garfield County Sheriff's Office
 Grand County Sheriff's Office
 Iron County Sheriff's Office
 Juab County Sheriff's Office
 Kane County Sheriff's Office
 Millard County Sheriff's Office
 Morgan County Sheriff's Office
 Piute County Sheriff's Office
 Rich County Sheriff's Office
 Salt Lake County Sheriff's Office
 San Juan County Sheriff's Office
 Sanpete County Sheriff's Office
 Sevier County Sheriff's Office
 Summit County Sheriff's Office
 Tooele County Sheriff's Office
 Uintah County Sheriff's Office
 Unified Police Department of Greater Salt Lake
 Utah County Sheriff's Office
 Wasatch County Sheriff's Office
 Washington County Sheriff's Office
 Wayne County Sheriff's Office
 Weber County Sheriff's Office

City agencies 

 Alta Marshal's Office
 Aurora Police Department
 American Fork Police Department
 Blanding Police Department
 Bluffdale Police Department
 Bountiful Police Department
 Brigham City Police Department
 Cedar City Police Department
 Centerville Police Department
 Clearfield Police Department
 Clinton Police Department
 Cottonwood Heights Police Department
 Draper Police Department
 East Carbon Police Department
 Enoch Police Department
 Ephraim City Police Department
 Escalante Police Department
 Farmington Police Department
 Grantsville Police Department
 Gunnison Police Department
 Harrisville Police Department
 Heber City Police Department
 Helper Police Department
 Herriman Police Department
 Hurricane Police Department
 Hyrum Police Department 
 Kamas Police Department 
 Kanab Police Department 
 Kaysville Police Department
 La Verkin Police Department 
 Layton Police Department
 Lehi Police Department 
 Lindon Police Department
 Logan Police Department
 Lone Peak Police Department
 Mantua Police Department
 Mapleton Police Department
 Minersville Marshal's Office
 Moab Police Department
 Monticello Police Department
 Moroni Police Department
 Murray Police Department
 Myton Police Department
 Naples Police Department
 Nephi Police Department
 North Ogden Police Department
 North Salt Lake Police Department
 Ogden Police Department
 Orem Department of Public Safety
 Park City Police Department
 Parowan Police Department
 Payson Police Department
 Perry Police Department
 Pleasant Grove Police Department
 Pleasant View Police Department
 Price Police Department
 Provo Police Department
 Richfield Police Department
 Riverdale Police Department
 Roosevelt Police Department
 Roy Police Department
 Salina Police Department
 Salem Police Department
 Salt Lake City Police Department
 Sandy Police Department
 Santaquin Police Department
 Saratoga Springs Police Department https://www.saratogaspringscity.com/
 Smithfield Police Department
 South Jordan Police Department
 South Ogden Police Department
 South Salt Lake Police Department
 Spanish Fork Police Department
 Springdale Police Department
 Springville Police Department
 St. George Police Department
 Stockton Police Department
 Sunset Police Department
 Syracuse Police Department
 Taylorsville Police Department
 Tooele Police Department
 Tremonton Police Department
 Vernal Police Department
 Washington City Department of Public Safety
 Wellington Police Department
 West Bountiful Police Department
 West Jordan Police Department
 West Valley City Police Department
 Willard Police Department
 Woods Cross Police Department

Multi-jurisdictional and district agencies

 Colorado City, Arizona-Hildale, Utah Marshal's Office
 Granite School District Police Department
 Lone Peak Police Department (Alpine & Highland)
 North Park Police Department (Hyde Park & North Logan)
 Salt Lake City Airport Police Department
 Santa Clara-Ivins Police Department
 Santaquin-Genola Police Department
 Unified Police Department of Greater Salt Lake
 Utah Transit Authority Police Department

College and university agencies

 Brigham Young University Police Department
 Dixie State University Police Department
 Salt Lake Community College Department of Public Safety
 Snow College Police Department
 Southern Utah University Police Department
 University of Utah Police Department
 Utah State University-Eastern Police Department
 Utah State University Police Department
 Utah Valley University Police Department
 Weber State University Police Department
 Westminster College Department of Patrol & Campus Safety

References

Utah
Law enforcement agencies of Utah
Law enforcement agencies